Max Albert Eiden (December 31, 1910 – August 22, 1954) was an American football player and coach of football and basketball. He served as the second head football coach at Boise Junior College—now known as Boise State University—coaching four seasons, from 1934 to 1937, and compiling a record of 11–17–1. Eiden was also the head basketball coach at Boise Junior College for four seasons, from 1934 to 1937, tallying a mark of 24–22.

Eiden was born on December 31, 1910, in Boise, Idaho. He attended Boise High School and then the University of Idaho, where he played college football as a guard. Eiden died on August 22, 1954, in McCall, Idaho.

Head coaching record

Football

References

External links
 

1910 births
1954 deaths
Boise State Broncos football coaches
Boise State Broncos men's basketball coaches
Idaho Vandals football players
Sportspeople from Boise, Idaho
Coaches of American football from Idaho
Players of American football from Idaho
Basketball coaches from Idaho